Mykolaiv Raion was a raion in Lviv Oblast in western Ukraine. Its administrative center was Mykolaiv. The raion was abolished on 18 July 2020 as part of the administrative reform of Ukraine, which reduced the number of raions of Lviv Oblast to seven. The area of Mykolaiv Raion was merged into Stryi Raion.

It was established in 1939.

At the time of disestablishment, the raion consisted of three hromadas:
 Mykolaiv urban hromada with the administration in Mykolaiv;
 Rozvadiv rural hromada with the administration in the selo of Rozvadiv;
 Trostianets rural hromada with the administration in the selo of Trostianets.

See also
 Administrative divisions of Lviv Oblast

References

External links
 mykolaiv.lviv.ua 

Former raions of Lviv Oblast
1939 establishments in Ukraine
Ukrainian raions abolished during the 2020 administrative reform